Presidential elections were held in Transvaal in 1888. The result was a victory for Paul Kruger, who defeated Piet Joubert by a wide margin.

Results

References

Elections in Transvaal
Transvaal
1888 in the South African Republic
1880s in Transvaal